The 2016 Auckland local elections took place between September and October 2016 by postal vote. The elections were the third since the merger of seven councils into the Auckland Council, which is composed of the mayor and 20 councillors, and 149 members of 21 local boards. Twenty-one district health board members and 41 licensing trust members were also elected.

Mayoral election

Incumbent Len Brown, the only Mayor of Auckland since the position was created, did not contest the mayoralty.

New Zealand Labour Party MP for Mount Roskill Phil Goff was elected mayor of Auckland.

Governing body elections
20 members were elected to the Auckland Council, across thirteen wards. There were 74 nominations and only one of the 13 wards was uncontested.

Rodney (1)
The incumbent was Penny Webster. She was defeated by Greg Sayers.

Albany (2)
The incumbents Wayne Walker and John Watson were both elected to council for another term.

North Shore (2)
The incumbents were Chris Darby and George Wood. Wood did not contest the ward in 2016. Darby was reelected as councillor. The second councillor elected was Richard Hills, although as preliminary results were extremely close between himself and next rival Grant Gillon, he was not confirmed until after the final results were announced.

Waitakere (2)
The incumbents deputy mayor Penny Hulse and Linda Cooper were both re-elected.

Waitemata and Gulf (1)
The incumbent Mike Lee was re-elected ahead of media personality Bill Ralston.

Whau (1)
The incumbent Ross Clow was reelected.

Albert-Eden-Roskill (2)
The incumbents Christine Fletcher and Cathy Casey were both reelected.

Maungakiekie-Tamaki (1)
The incumbent Denise Krum was re-elected after switching from Communities and Residents to Auckland Future; at the same time, she reverted to her maiden name Denise Lee. Auckland Future mistakenly entered two candidates to contest the ward. While they could not remove Tiseli from the ballot, Auckland Future were able to remove their affiliation from his candidacy.

Manukau (2)
The incumbents were Alf Filipaina and Arthur Anae. Anae did not contest the ward in 2016. Filipaina was reelected and joined by new councillor Efeso Collins.

Manurewa-Papakura (2)
The incumbents were John Walker and Calum Penrose. Walker was reelected however Penrose was ousted by Daniel Newman, the only candidate not already a councillor.

Franklin (1)
The incumbent, Bill Cashmore, was the only candidate and so was declared  elected unopposed.

Ōrākei (1)
The incumbent, Cameron Brewer, was elected unopposed in 2013 but did not contest the ward in 2016. Desley Simpson was comfortably elected.

Howick (2)
The incumbents, Dick Quax and Sharon Stewart, were elected unopposed in 2013. Despite eight other candidates contesting the ward in 2016, both were reelected.

Licensing Trust elections
35 Members were elected to 5 licensing trusts across Auckland.

Birkenhead Licensing Trust (6)

Mt Wellington Licensing Trust (6)

Portage Licensing Trust

Ward No 1 – Auckland City (3)

Ward No 2 – New Lynn (2)

Ward No 3 – Glen Eden (2)

Ward No 4 – Titirangi / Green Bay (2)

Ward No 5 – Kelston West (1)

Waitakere Licensing Trust

Ward No 1 – Te Atatū (2)

Ward No 2 –Lincoln (3)

Ward No 3 – Waitakere (1)

Ward No 4 – Henderson (1)

Wiri Licensing Trust (6)

References

Auckland
Auckland
Local elections 2016
2010s in Auckland